"Anyway" is a song co-written and recorded by American country music artist Martina McBride.  It was released in November 2006 as the first single from her album Waking Up Laughing. McBride wrote this song with Brad and Brett Warren of The Warren Brothers.

History
The song marks the first time in Martina's career that she has co-written one of her own singles. It is an inspirational song based on a favorite poem of Mother Teresa's, written by Kent Keith, which he originally titled, "The Paradoxical Commandments".

At the 2007 Country Music Association Awards, "Anyway" was nominated for Single of the Year and Song of the Year awards.

"Anyway" was first released on November 6, 2006, where McBride performed the song to promote it. However, the single was released to the iTunes Store February 13, 2007.

Kristy Lee Cook performed the song on the seventh season of American Idol on Top 8 Inspirational Week in 2008.

Lauren Alaina performed the song on the 10th season of  American Idol on Top 4 Inspirational Week in 2011. It was considered one of the best versions of the original song.

Music video
A music video was released for the song and was directed by Deaton-Flanigen Productions. In the view, McBride is shown standing in the middle of a street with pedestrians walking past her. These people are then shown standing together on a sidewalk, waiting for a stoplight that turned red. Throughout the video, each individual's thoughts appear as text on the screen. Scenes of McBride performing in a dark room with strings of hanging blue and white lights are also featured. The video ends with the light turning green, and everyone, including McBride, walking away.

Chart performance
"Anyway" was Martina McBride's biggest hit since 2004, reaching a peak of number 5 on the U.S. Billboard Hot Country Songs chart in mid-2007. The song was also a Top 40 hit on the U.S. Billboard Hot 100 and a Top 20 hit on the U.S. Billboard Adult Contemporary Tracks chart.

Year-end charts

Personnel 
 Martina McBride – vocals 
 Gordon Mote – acoustic piano 
 B. James Lowery – acoustic guitar 
 Paul Worley – acoustic guitar, electric guitar 
 J. T. Corenflos – electric guitar
 Steve Gibson – electric guitar 
 Dann Huff – electric guitar 
 Brent Mason – electric guitar 
 Dan Dugmore – dobro
 Glenn Worf – bass 
 Matt Chamberlain – drums 
 David Huff – percussion 
 David Campbell – string arrangements and conductor 
 The Nashville String Machine – strings

Certifications

Awards and nominations
In 2008, the song was nominated for a Dove Award for Country Recorded Song of the Year at the 39th GMA Dove Awards.

References

2006 singles
2005 songs
Martina McBride songs
Songs written by Martina McBride
Songs written by the Warren Brothers
RCA Records Nashville singles
Music videos directed by Deaton-Flanigen Productions